Sarah E. Reilly  (born 3 July 1973) is an English-born Irish sprinter. She represented Ireland in the women's 100 metres at the 2000 Summer Olympics.

Reilly adopted Irish nationality on 7 June 2000.

Her husband is Irish high jumper Brendan Reilly.

References

External links
 

1973 births
Living people
Athletes (track and field) at the 2000 Summer Olympics
Irish female sprinters
Olympic athletes of Ireland
Place of birth missing (living people)
Olympic female sprinters
Sportspeople from Leeds